Community Chest originally referred to a box for holding money or other valuables kept by a small organization and requiring more than one key to be simultaneously turned to open its lock, preventing embezzlement by any single key holder. It may refer to:

Organizations:
Community Chest (organization), a forerunner of the United Way of America
The Community Chest of Hong Kong
Community Chest of Korea
Central Community Chest of Japan
The Community Chest of Singapore

Other:
Chance and Community Chest cards, an aspect of the game Monopoly
Community Chest, a French communication agency that specialized in implementing brand presence in Second Life
Monopoly Community Chest, a game on Family Game Night
The Community Chest, an Australian rock band featuring Adem K